WGKS (96.9 FM) is a commercial radio station broadcasting a classic hits radio format and calling itself "KISS 96-9". Licensed to Paris, Kentucky, United States, the station serves the Lexington-Fayette media market. It is owned by L.M. Communications, Inc.  Studios and offices are located at Triangle Center on West Main Street in Lexington. The transmitter is off Houston Antioch Road, also in Lexington.

WGKS airs two weekday syndicated shows. The Bob and Sheri Show from WLNK in Charlotte, North Carolina is heard in morning drive time. The Delilah Show is heard evenings.

History
The station was assigned the call sign WCOZ on February 25, 1984. On June 11, 1992, the station changed its call letters to WCOZ-FM. Just over a week later, on June 19, the station changed its call sign to the current WGKS.

On September 22, 2020, WGKS changed their format from soft AC to classic hits, still under the "Kiss 96.9" branding.

References

External links

GKS
Classic hits radio stations in the United States
Paris, Kentucky